Only a Shadow is a live album by Misty Edwards, released by Forerunner Music on March 19, 2013.

Reception

Matt Conner, awarding the album three stars from CCM Magazine, stated "[it] is a powerful album filled with vertical anthems and prophetic moments". Giving the album four and a half stars at New Release Tuesday, Kevin Davis wrote  "The ethereal musical style and Misty’s powerful and gorgeous vocals keep me hanging on every word she sings and speaks". Stephen Curry, rating the album a nine out of ten for Cross Rhythms opined "The 14 songs on the CD capture Misty's soaring vocals while displaying a heart for worship transparent in its sincerity".

Track listing

Charts

See also
 Misty Edwards discography

References

2013 live albums
Misty Edwards albums